The copper-tailed starling or copper-tailed glossy-starling (Hylopsar cupreocauda) is a species of starling in the family Sturnidae. It is found in Ivory Coast, Ghana, Guinea, Liberia, and Sierra Leone. Its natural habitat is tropical moist lowland forests. It is threatened by habitat loss.

References

External links
Image on ADW

Hylopsar
Birds of West Africa
Birds described in 1857
Taxonomy articles created by Polbot